Ell Lake is a lake in the U.S. state of Wisconsin.

Ell Lake most likely owes its name to the resemblance it shares with the letter L.

References

Lakes of Wisconsin
Bodies of water of Portage County, Wisconsin